The ReAwaken America Tour is an American far-right and Christian nationalist political protest movement launched in 2021. Its rallies have promoted a variety of right-wing and far-right conspiracy theories, including COVID-19 misinformation, Stop The Steal, and QAnon.

Founder 
The ReAwaken America tour was founded by Clay Clark, a business coach and entrepreneur and former mayoral candidate in Tulsa, Oklahoma. In August 2020, Clark initiated a lawsuit against the city of Tulsa for its mask mandate to help prevent the spread of COVID-19. The lawsuit alleged that wearing masks caused oxygen deprivation, leading to "migraine headaches, shortness of breath and dizziness." The lawsuit was dropped in March 2021.

Clark has publicly espoused his belief in COVID-19 conspiracy theories. When he spoke at the January 5, 2021 rally held at Freedom Plaza in Washington, D.C. in support of Donald Trump's protest of the outcome of the 2020 U.S. presidential election, Clark told attendees that the coronavirus pandemic was a hoax and instructed them to "turn to the person next to you and give them a hug, someone you don't know. Go hug somebody. Go ahead and spread it out, mass spreader. It's a mass-spreader event!"

On a June 2021 episode of the Stew Peters Show, he argued that the COVID-19 vaccine contained luceiferase, which he believed was a cryptocurrency technology associated with the Mark of the Beast prophesied in Revelation 13:16-18. This conspiracy theory, according to Clark, included Bill Gates (under the influence of performance artist and alleged Satanist Marina Abramović), and Jeffrey Epstein. Clark accused Gates and Epstein of attempting to create a new race of humans by combining luciferase and Epstein's DNA into the COVID-19 vaccine.

At an October 2021 rally in Salt Lake City, Utah, Clark made the unproven claim that "COVID-19 is 100 percent treatable using budesonide, hydroxychloroquine and ivermectin." He also accused George Soros of funding remdesivir, a drug used to treat severe cases of COVID-19 but which Clark said was "killing COVID-19 patients in the hospital because it causes renal failure".

Background and itinerary

Origins 
According to Clark, as the COVID-19 pandemic began in early 2020, he asked God, "What can I do to stop the quarantines, the curfews, the mandates, the lockdowns?" The answer he received, Clark said, with "100% of God-ordained clarity . . . was to begin reawakening America." Despite the religious origins of the tour, it has been criticised by major Christian leaders.

In the spring of 2021, Clark inaugurated the "Health and Freedom" events to protest COVID-19 mitigation measures such as masking and vaccinations. According to Clark, he was inspired to undertake the tour by a 1963 prophecy by Charismatic minister Kenneth E. Hagin, who predicted that "there would be an atheistic, communist, Marxist and racially divisive spirit that would descend upon America" and that "the spark of the revival would start from Tulsa, Oklahoma." Clark also stated that he received confirmation of his importance from a 2013 prophecy by the South-African Charismatic evangelist Kim Clement, who identified a "Mr. Clark" about whom he believed God said: "You have been determined through your prayers to influence this nation. You're watching me; you're an influential person. The Spirit of God says, 'Hear the word of the prophet to you as a king, I will open that door that you prayed about.'"

As of January 2023, the majority of the ReAwaken America events have been held at churches.

2021 
In the summer of 2021, the "Health and Freedom" events were rebranded the ReAwaken America Tour, sponsored by Charisma News. In an interview with Rolling Stone, Clark cited a meeting with Michael Flynn - a frequent guest on the tour - as the impetus for turning the Health and Freedom events into a tour, with Clark telling Flynn that "God wants us to do a tour" and Flynn agreeing. While the events (under both names) initially received attention for their opposition to COVID-19 mitigation measures, from the beginning, they also focused significant attention on supporting conspiracy theories related to the 2020 presidential election, including those espoused by QAnon followers.

During the November event held at Cornerstone Church in San Antonio, Texas, Clark reportedly led attendees in the "Let's Go Brandon!" chant, a euphemism used in place of the more explicit "Fuck Joe Biden!" At the same event, Michael Flynn stated, "If we are going to have one nation under God, which we must, we have to have one religion. One nation under God, and one religion under God."

At the December event held at Elevate Life Church in Dallas, Texas, several speakers, including Joe Oltmann and Jovan Hutton Pulitzer, became ill. Oltmann claimed that he was "99%" sure that his symptoms were from contact with anthrax. Clark denied the accusation, saying that what some people believed was an anthrax attack was actually just a fog machine. He also denied being part of the Illuminati.

In December 2021, Eric Coomer, a former executive at Dominion Voting Systems, filed a federal defamation lawsuit against Clark, his ThriveTime Show, and his ReAwaken America Tour for having "monetized a false election fraud narrative" that produced "a constant drumbeat of outright falsehoods intended to place [Eric] Coomer at the center of a conspiracy theory to defraud the American people." The suit alleges that Clark began his attacks in December 2020 during a podcast interview when he told Joe Oltmann that Coomer "could/should be put to death" for treason.

2022 
In early 2022, Clay Clark began incorporating conspiracy theories about the "Great Reset" into the tour.

At the March event in San Diego, Michael Flynn said, "We need you to charge the machine gun nest…. Maybe I'm just asking you to dig a little bit deeper there or hold this side of the line, or form up cause we're gonna counterattack over here, and that counterattack is, we're gonna go after school boards." This language led some commentators to charge Flynn with inciting violence against educators for allegedly teaching critical race theory.

One of the themes speakers focused on in 2022 events was the alleged connection between supernatural activity and U.S. politics. At the March event in San Diego, for example, one speaker warned, "Do not be surprised if the Angel of Death shows up in Washington." At the May event in Myrtle Beach, Mark Burns told the audience, "You wanna get rid of Lindsey Graham? Then get rid of the demonic territory that's over the land." Roger Stone stated that "there is a Satanic portal above the White House" that first appeared after Joe Biden became president. Stone claimed that the portal "must be closed. And it will be closed by prayer."

In July 2022, the Main Street Armory in Rochester, New York cancelled the ReAwaken America event scheduled there for dates in August, citing “the outpour[ing] of concern from our community.” Prior to its cancellation, the bands Japanese Breakfast and Joywave had cancelled events at the Main Street Armory citing the scheduled ReAwaken America events.

Event dates and locations

2021

2022

2023

List of speakers 
The lineup of speakers at each tour event varies. The following is a partial list of 2021-23 speakers:

 Ty Bollinger, American alternative medicine advocate
 Jim Breuer, Comedian and former SNL cast member
 Mark Burns, American pastor and 2022 South Carolina congressional candidate
 Patrick M. Byrne, former CEO of Overstock.com
 Mark Cabrera and Martha Cabrera, Pastors at Revival Ministries International
 Jim Caviezel, American actor
 William Cook, American pastor and founder of America's Black Robe Regiment
 Sean Feucht, American activist and Christian singer-songwriter
 Michael Flynn, U.S. Army general and former National Security Advisor
 Simone Gold, U.S. doctor and anti-vaccine activist
 Bob Hall, Texas state senator
 Mark Victor Hansen, American motivational speaker and author
 Gene Ho, Donald Trump's former photographer and unsuccessful 2021 candidate for mayor of Myrtle Beach, South Carolina
 Phil Hotsenpiller, Co-founder and senior pastor, Influence Church (Anaheim, CA)
 Stella Immanuel, Cameroonian-American physician and pastor
 Jonathan Isaac, Orlando Magic basketball player
 Alex Jones, American radio host and conspiracy theorist
 Robert F. Kennedy Jr., American environmental lawyer and anti-vaccine activist
 Alan Keyes, American politician and former U.S. presidential candidate
 Anna Khait, professional poker player and former Survivor contestant
 Charlie Kirk, American political activist and radio talk show host
 Jackson Lahmeyer, Tulsa pastor and former candidate for the U.S. Senate
 Mike Lindell, American businessman and conservative political activist
 Greg Locke, Tennessee pastor
 Lara Logan, South African journalist and war correspondent
 Richard Mack, leader in Oath Keepers and founder of Constitutional Sheriffs and Peace Officers Association 
 Jurgen Matthesius, lead pastor of Awaken Church in San Diego, California
 Judy Mikovits, former American research scientist and anti-vaccine activist
 Peter Navarro, American economist and author
 Kash Patel, Lawyer and former Trump administration staffer
 Ken Paxton, Texas attorney general (2015–present)
 Sidney Powell, American attorney
 Chad Prather, American Internet personality
 Wendy Rogers, Arizona state senator and conspiracy theorist
 Owen Shroyer, Infowars show host and conspiracy theorist
 Sam Sorbo, American actress and radio host
 Angela Stanton-King, Reality TV show star and QAnon conspiracy theorist
 Roger Stone, American political consultant and lobbyist
 Steve Strang, founder and CEO of Charisma News
 Melissa Tate, Conservative author
 Eric Trump, son of former U.S. President Donald J. Trump
 Carlo Maria Viganò, former Apostolic Nuncio to the United States (2011–16)
 Andy Wakefield, Former British physician
 James "Phil" Waldron, retired U.S. Army colonel and bar owner
 Lin Wood, American attorney and conspiracy theorist
 Vladimir Zelenko, Ukrainian-American family physician

References 

Christian nationalism
COVID-19 misinformation
American conspiracy theorists
Political movements in the United States
QAnon
Trumpism
2021 establishments in the United States